The 2016 NRJ Music Awards was the 18th edition of the NRJ Music Awards, which took place on November 12, 2016, at the Palais des Festivals, in Cannes, France. The ceremony was broadcast live, but with a 5 to 15-minute delay due to terrorist threats, on TF1 and NRJ, and hosted by Nikos Aliagas.

Performances

Winners
The winners were revealed on November 12, 2016.

References

External links
NRJ Awards official website

2016 in French music
2016 music awards
21st century in Provence-Alpes-Côte d'Azur
November 2016 events in France